PB-33 Nushki is a constituency of the Provincial Assembly of Balochistan.

See also
 PB-32 Kharan
 PB-34 Surab

References

External links
 Election commission Pakistan's official website
 Awazoday.com check result
 Balochistan's Assembly official site

Constituencies of Balochistan